Jhansi Rani Square is a metro station on the Aqua Line of the Nagpur Metro. It was opened on 28 January 2020.

A mural of Rani Lakshmibai was installed on the station's facade in September 2020. The mural was designed by Deepti Deshpande of Hastankit, and is made of mild steel. It measures 16.5 feet by 9 feet and weighs about 200 kg.

Station Layout

References

Nagpur Metro stations
Railway stations in India opened in 2020